Amber Brown is a series of realistic fiction books for children created and originally written by Paula Danziger; later written by Elizabeth Levy and Bruce Coville. Early editions are illustrated by Tony Ross and later by Anthony Lewis.  The original series is narrated in first person by a nine-year-old Amber Brown, starting near the end of her third grade and through the summer after her fourth grade while turning ten. Danziger's balance of humor and personal tribulations are masterfully balanced to reach readers on a deep level throughout the series.

Amber Brown is Not a Crayon begins the series some time after her mother and father have separated. While Amber's mother now dates Max, Amber's father pursues a new job in Paris. As if divorce and geographical separation from one parent isn't enough for a third grader to handle, Amber's lifelong best friend, Justin Daniels, finds out that he is moving to Alabama.  This hurtful separation and the tribulations of getting caught in the middle of divorced parents set the foundation for the remainder of the series.

A series of picture books for young readers titled A is for Amber was also published by Danziger with illustrations by Ross and featured adventures with Amber and Justin before Justin moved away and before Amber's parents divorced but after they are already regularly arguing.

Audiobook releases of installments in the series are available, published by Live Oak Media and read by Dana Lubotsky. The recordings of the A is for Amber series feature original music and sound effects.

The series was originally inspired by Danziger's real-life niece, Carrie Danziger, shortly after both of her best friends moved away in the same summer.  While Amber was a creative conglomeration of Paula Danziger's design, aspects of Carrie's life were used throughout the series.  The second title, "You Can't Eat Your Chicken Pox Amber Brown" was inspired by the Danziger girls going to England together and Carrie getting chicken pox her first night in England.  Ross also used Carrie as the model for the original illustration of Amber.

The series originally ended in 2004 with the death of the author Paula Danziger. In 2012, a new title in the series, Amber Brown is Tickled Pink, was announced. Written by popular children's authors Bruce Coville and Elizabeth Levy, whom Danziger described as her best friend and her other best friend, the new title was released on September 13, 2012.  Tony Ross returns as the illustrator for this installment. Two additional titles were released in 2013 and 2014. The second new title, Amber Brown is On the Move, was released on September 12, 2013 and a final title, Amber Brown Horses Around, was released in 2014. Anthony Lewis relieves Ross as the illustrator of these titles.  The idea to revive the series originated with Danziger's agent, Amy Berkower.

A television adaptation of Amber Brown was ordered by Apple TV+ in September 2021. The series is produced by Boat Rocker with Bonnie Hunt as writer, executive producer and showrunner. The series stars Carsyn Rose as Amber Brown and Sarah Drew as Amber’s mother, Sarah Brown. Darin Brooks, and Lillana Inouye are also attached. In the television series, Amber Brown is a biracial girl.

References

Book series introduced in 1994
American children's books
Series of children's books
Children's books adapted into television shows